Kolam Kuttama, is a 2022 Sri Lankan mystery-drama thriller television series broadcast on Swarnavahini TV. It is directed by Jayaprakash Sivagurunathan, co-produced by Chethani Wijetunga, Sri Lal Wickramage and written by Saddha Mangala Sooriyabandara. It aired every weekday from 9:30 pm to 10:00 pm onwards. It is broadcast from 3 August 2022 as the spin-off series of popular television serial Nadagamkarayo.

Plot 
The series based on the traditional masks and puppetry in Ambalangoda area, and was created based on a master puppeteer and a mask-cutting artist and two mysterious outsiders. The serials started with the end credits of Nadagamkarayo where the Kolam Kuttama dance troupe wins in the doubtful manner against Ruparathna master's Nadagamkarayo troupe.

Cast and characters

Main cast 
 Nalin Pradeep Udawela as Sumanapala Gurunnanse
 Sampath Jayaweera as Dolapihilla 'Dole' mahaththaya
 Chameera Liyanage as Senal
 Kavindya Dulshani as Minimuthu aka Suddi 
 Anuradha Edirisinghe as Hiruni

Supporting cast
 Rahal Bulathsinhala as Loku Hamuduruwo
 Theekshana Sri Wijesinghe as Jina
 Mali Jayaweerage as Hichchi nona
 Mauli Ferdinando as Chuta              
 Sarath Kulanga as Sirimanne, music master
 Nirosha Thalagala as Sabeetha
 Nino Araliya as Ranmuthu, Hiruni's love interest, Suddi's brother
 Nilmini Kottegoda as Latha, Master's wife
 Sisira Thadikara as Gunapala Gurunnanse

Minor cast
 Anton Cooray as School teacher
 Chaminda Batukotuwa as Hokandara
 Mayura Kanchana as Sena, Sabeetha's husband
 Nimal Jayasinghe
 Thilan Warnajith
 Manoj Yalegama as Eethipala, the boatman
 Madushan Hathlahawaththa
 Duminda Sandaruwan
 Abishake Mithun Thilakarathna as Hinni mahaththaya
 Maleesha Dakshina
 Bhanuka Senadeera
 Adithya Anuradanayake
 Viraj Silva
 Gandhara Thurya Sanka as Samantha (Dole mahaththaya Assistan)
 Sajith Siyambalagoda
 Sujani Maduwanthi as Bhagya
 Thilini Kaushalya
 Varushani Rajathewa
 Genisha Dilrukshi
 Sanduni Kaushalya
 Devindi Kanchana
 Dilini Weerasinghe
 Sayuri Dissanayake
 Raneesha Pathirana
 Hiruni Dayaratne
 Yashara Bandara
 Keshi Rajapaksa
 Anjali Jayasinghe
 Sithara Kulatunga

References 

Sri Lankan television shows
2022 Sri Lankan television series debuts
Swarnavahini original programming